The Battle of Nicosia Hospital was a military engagement during the Cyprus Emergency. The EOKA planned a raid to rescue Polykarpos Giorkatzis, an EOKA prisoner who had been transferred to hospital. The escape was successful, although the team suffered casualties.

References 

Nicosia Hospital
Cyprus Emergency
August 1956 events in Europe
1956 in Cyprus
History of Nicosia